"The Raven" is a 1975 song by the Alan Parsons Project from their album Tales of Mystery and Imagination, and first song of the band. The song is based on the Edgar Allan Poe poem of the same name; the song was written by Alan Parsons and Eric Woolfson, and was originally recorded in April 1975, at Mama Jo's Studio, North Hollywood, Los Angeles and Abbey Road Studios, London.

It was one of the first rock songs to use a vocoder, developed by EMS, to distort vocals. It is also one of the few songs by the band featuring the vocals of Alan Parsons, who sings the first verse through the EMI vocoder. Actor Leonard Whiting performs the lead vocals for the remainder of the song, with Eric Woolfson and a choir as backing vocals.

The single appeared on the US Billboard Hot 100 chart peaking at #80 in October 1976.

The 1987 reissued version of the song contains a guitar solo near the end, before the "Quoth the Raven"/"Nevermore, nevermore, nevermore, never!" refrains and a few licks between the lyrics.

In 2004, the choral band Gregorian made a cover of the song for their album The Dark Side.

American rapper Danny Brown sampled the song for "Clean Up" on his 2013 album Old.

Personnel

Original (1976)
Burleigh Drummond, Stuart Tosh — drums
Bob Howes and the English Chorale — choir vocals
Christopher North — keyboards
David Pack — guitars
Alan Parsons — opening lead vocals (using EMI vocoder)
Andrew Powell — conducted and arranged orchestra
Joe Puerta — bass guitar
Leonard Whiting — lead vocals
Eric Woolfson — backing vocals, keyboards

Reissue (1987)
Ian Bairnson — lead guitar solo

References 

1975 debut singles
1975 songs
Music based on works by Edgar Allan Poe
Funk rock songs
The Alan Parsons Project songs
Songs written by Alan Parsons
Songs written by Eric Woolfson
Song recordings produced by Alan Parsons
20th Century Fox Records singles
Songs based on poems
Songs about birds
Songs about fictional characters
Halloween songs